, abbreviated as  is a private university in Kanazawa, Ishikawa, Japan. The university is locally nicknamed Hokudai, though typically the term is used nationwide to refer to Hokkaido University.

History
Founded in 1975, it was founded as a single-department college with the Faculty of Pharmaceutical Sciences. The Faculty of Foreign Languages and the Faculty of Law were established in 1987 and 1992, respectively.

The School of Future Learning was established in 2004, making it the newest.

At the end of March 2005, Hokuriku University owned 4.44% of the outstanding stock in FM Tokyo.

Academic organization

Faculties
 Faculty of Pharmaceutical Sciences
 School of Future Learning
Department of Legal Studies I: students study business management and law.
Department of Communication Studies I: students study foreign languages (English and Chinese).
 Graduate Studies in Pharmaceutical Sciences

Facilities
 Real Video Education System, an on-demand video system for viewing and reviewing recorded lectures. Students can access RVES from any internet-connected computer.
 Hokudai/Cast: a trilingual podcast in English, Chinese, and Japanese; includes interviews, music (in Japanese, English, and Chinese), language learning segments, and an English 'Word for Today'; created by HU students and faculty. Also available on iTunes.
 Sound Track: the Hokuriku University gymnasium. It has a swimming pool, weight lifting room, sauna, and aerobics area.
 Library Centers
 Computing Services Center
 Center of Development for Education
 International Exchange Center coordinates the many exchange programs HU has with other schools (in Australia, England, the US and others), including a program where HU students can study English and Chinese in China (link is in Japanese). The IEC also coordinates Hokuriku University's Japanese Language Course for foreign students (link is in English).

Sister/friendship institutions

Japan
Kanazawa Medical University

South Korea
Kyung Hee University
Kyungnam University
Daejeon University
Dongguk University
Sangmyung University

China
Beijing University
Beijing University of Chinese Medicine
Beijing Language and Culture University
Shanghai International Studies University
Tianjin Foreign Studies University
Shenyang Pharmaceutical University
Liaoning Normal University
Dalian University of Foreign Languages
Soochow University
Nanjing University
Southeast University
Nanjing Arts Institute
Nanjing University of Finance and Economics
Xuzhou Normal University
Nanjing Agricultural University
Heilongjiang University
Yanbian University
Northeast Normal University
Zhenjiang Medical College
Dalian University

Malaysia
Universiti Tunku Abdul Rahman

Mongolia
Mongolian University of the Humanities
Mongolian Knowledge University
Soyombo Management Institute
Mandakh Institute of Accountancy

Taiwan
Chinese Culture University
Tamkang University
Chienkuo University of Technology

Russian Federation
Far Eastern Federal University
Irkutsk State University
Khabarovsk State Academy of Economics and Law
Krasnojarsk University

Germany
University of Trier

United Kingdom
London Metropolitan University
Bath Spa University

Spain
Autonomous University of Madrid

United States
University of California, Riverside
Ohio University
Georgetown University
US Naval Academy
University at Buffalo, The State University of New York
University of Georgia
Hawaii Pacific University

New Zealand
Waikato University
Massey University

Australia
University of Wollongong
Flinders University
University of Melbourne

Notable faculty
Takao Abe: a former professor of the Faculty of Law and the current mayor of Kawasaki, Kanagawa

External links
Official website in Japanese
Official website in English
Official website in Chinese

Educational institutions established in 1975
Kanazawa
Private universities and colleges in Japan
Universities and colleges in Ishikawa Prefecture
1975 establishments in Japan